Jennings is a small settlement in Saint Mary Parish on the island of Antigua, in Antigua and Barbuda.

It is located in the west of the island.

The town is on the road between the capital city St. John's and the town of Bolans, and some three kilometres from Five Island Harbour on the west coast.

Demographics 
Jennings has five enumeration districts.

 81900 Jennings-Central
 82000 Jennings-South
 82101  Jennings-Yorks_1
 82102  Jennings-Yorks_2 
 82200 Jennings-CedarHall

Census Data

References 

Populated places in Antigua and Barbuda
Saint Mary Parish, Antigua and Barbuda